Sándor Sík (20 January 1889 – 28 September 1963) was a Hungarian writer and priest, a representative of the New Catholic poetry in Hungary. He was a professor of literature at Szeged University from 1930; from 1948 he was the Piarist Order's highest representative in Hungary. He published the Catholic magazine Vigilia. In addition to his poetry, his historical dramas and mystery plays saw success. His brother was Hunagrian the communist politician Endre Sík.

References

Hungarian writers
20th-century Hungarian Roman Catholic priests
1889 births
1963 deaths